The women's discus throw event at the 2014 World Junior Championships in Athletics was held in Eugene, Oregon, USA, at Hayward Field on 24 and 25 July.

Medalists

Results

Final
25 July
Start time: 19:47  Temperature: 27 °C  Humidity: 37 %
End time: 20:49  Temperature: 25 °C  Humidity: 41 %

Qualifications
24 July
With qualifying standard of 52.00 (Q) or at least the 12 best performers (q) advance to the Final

Summary

Details
With qualifying standard of 52.00 (Q) or at least the 12 best performers (q) advance to the Final

Group A
25 July
Start time; 09:58  Temperature: 14 °C  Humidity: 77 %
End time: 10:39  Temperature: 16 °C  Humidity: 68 %

Group B
25 July
Start time; 11:19  Temperature: 19 °C  Humidity: 56 %
End time: 11:56  Temperature: 20 °C  Humidity: 56 %

Participation
According to an unofficial count, 31 athletes from 24 countries participated in the event.

References

Discus throw
Discus throw at the World Athletics U20 Championships
2014 in women's athletics